Radcliffe is a tram stop in the town of Radcliffe, Greater Manchester, England. It is on the Bury Line of Greater Manchester's light rail Metrolink system.

History

It originally opened on 1 September 1879 as Radcliffe New railway station on the former heavy rail line from Manchester Victoria to Bury. It was named Radcliffe Central railway station to differentiate it from Radcliffe Bridge railway station on the line from Manchester to Bury via Clifton which closed in 1966.

It was rebuilt in 1956 to the designs of the architect John Broome

Metrolink

The stop lies within Ticketing Zone 4. There is a walkway from the stop towards the town centre and Radcliffe Bus Station. A blue neon sign adorns the front of the station which reads "From the tower, falls the shadow", this was added in 2005. The station is located across from Radcliffe Leisure Centre, Spring Lane School, and a popular National Cycle Network route which was a continuation of the railway line.

Services
Services mostly run every 12 minutes on 2 routes, forming a 6-minute service between Bury and Manchester at peak times.

Connecting bus routes
Radcliffe Metrolink station is served by Diamond's 524 service, which runs frequently between Bury, Radcliffe and Bolton. It is also served by Vision bus's 513 service, which also runs between Bury, Radcliffe and Farnworth that runs near the station.
Radcliffe is also served by Radcliffe bus station.

Gallery

References

External links

Radcliffe Stop Information
Radcliffe area map

Tram stops in the Metropolitan Borough of Bury
Former Lancashire and Yorkshire Railway stations
Railway stations in Great Britain opened in 1879
Railway stations in Great Britain closed in 1991
Railway stations in Great Britain opened in 1992
Tram stops on the Altrincham to Bury line
Tram stops on the Bury to Ashton-under-Lyne line
Radcliffe, Greater Manchester
John Broome railway stations